The Balsz Elementary School District #31 is a school district on the east side of Phoenix, Arizona.  It currently includes five schools, which are:
Pat Tillman Middle School (formerly Balsz Elementary School), established as a one-room school house in 1888; Griffith Elementary School, built in 1951;
David Crockett Elementary School, opened in 1955; Orangedale Early Learning Center (most recently converted from a junior high), and
Brunson-Lee Elementary School, opened in 2003. As of 2016 the school district's superintendent is Jeffrey J. Smith.  The district feeds into Phoenix Union High School District.

References

External links
 Balsz Elementary School District 31 website

School districts in Phoenix, Arizona
School districts in Maricopa County, Arizona
1888 establishments in Arizona Territory
School districts established in 1888